Japan competed at the 2008 Summer Paralympics in Beijing, China. The country's delegation included a women's goalball team, men's and women's sitting volleyball teams, men's and women's wheelchair basketball teams, a wheelchair rugby team, and one wheelchair fencer.

Medalists

Sports

Archery

Men

|-
|align=left|Akira Haraguchi
|rowspan=3 align=left|Men's individual recurve standing
|557
|20
|L 83–109
|colspan=5|did not advance
|-
|align=left|Takahiro Hasegawa
|611
|7
|Bye
|L 94–100
|colspan=4|did not advance
|-
|align=left|Kimimasa Onodera
|620
|5
|Bye
|L 96–100
|colspan=4|did not advance
|-
|align=left|Tsunehiko Naganuma
|rowspan=2 align=left|Men's individual recurve W1/W2
|576
|20
|L 80–93
|colspan=5|did not advance
|-
|align=left|Nobuji Yoshida
|560
|22
|W 89–74
|L 98–106
|colspan=4|did not advance
|-
|align=left|Takahiro Hasegawa Tsunehiko Naganuma Kimimasa Onodera
|align=left|Men's team recurve
|1807
|4
|colspan=2 
|W 188–183
|L 188–201
|L 194–207
|4
|}

Women

|-
|align=left|Chieko Kamiya
|align=left|Women's individual compound open
|627
|7
|colspan=2 
|W 107–106
|W 106–104
|L 98–112
|
|-
|align=left|Kimiko Konishi
|rowspan=2 align=left|Women's individual recurve standing
|536
|12
|
|L 90–93
|colspan=4|did not advance
|-
|align=left|Yae Yamakawa
|561
|8
|
|L 79–85
|colspan=4|did not advance
|-
|align=left|Aya Nakanishi
|rowspan=2 align=left|Women's individual recurve W1/W2
|447
|19
|W 82–78
|W 82–74
|W 90–84
|L 76–82
|L 94–98
|4
|-
|align=left|Ayako Saitoh
|543
|9
|Bye
|W 86–76
|L 90–96
|colspan=3|did not advance
|-
|align=left|Kimiko Konishi Ayako Saitoh Yae Yamakawa
|align=left|Women's team recurve
|1640
|3
|colspan=2 
|L 167–174
|colspan=3|did not advance
|}

Athletics

Men's track

Men's field

Women's track

Women's field

Boccia

Cycling

Men's road

Men's track

Equestrian

Goalball

The women's goalball team didn't win any medals; they were in seventh place in the preliminary stage.

Players
Akiko Adachi
Mieko Kato
Masae Komiya
Yuki Naoi
Tomoe Takada
Rie Urata

Tournament

Judo

Men

Women

Powerlifting

Men

Rowing

Shooting

Men

Women

Swimming

Men

Women

Table tennis

Volleyball

Men's tournament
The men's volleyball team didn't win any medals; they were 8th out of 8 teams.
Players
Shun Azuma
Satoshi Kanao
Susumu Kaneda
Tetsuo Minakawa
Kaname Nakayama
Susumu Takasago
Yoshihito Takeda
Tsutomu Tanabe
Koji Tanaka
Arata Yamamoto
Atsushi Yonezawa
Hitoshi Yoshida

Results

5–8th Semifinals

7–8th Classification

Women's tournament
The women's volleyball team didn't win any medals; they were 8th out of 8 teams.
Players
Sachie Awano
Junko Fujii
Noriko Kaneda
Emi Kaneki
Yukari Okahira
Shiori Omura
Mamiko Osada
Yoko Saito
Haruni Sakamoto
Tomoko Sakamoto
Kiyoko Tomiya

Results

5–8th Semifinals

7th–8th Classification

Wheelchair basketball

Men's tournament
The men's basketball team didn't win any medals; they were 7th out of 12 teams.
Players
Shingo Fujii
Reo Fujimoto
Keisuke Koretomo
Hiroaki Kozai
Kazuyuki Kyoya
Kenzo Maeda
Fumiharu Miura
Tetsuya Miyajima
Noriyuki Mori
Tomohiko Oshima
Satoshi Sato
Akimasa Suzuki

Results

 

 

 
Quarterfinals

 
5–8th Classification

7th–8th Classification

Women's tournament
The women's basketball team didn't win any medals; they were defeated by Australia in the bronze medal match.
Players
Mari Amimoto
Yuka Betto
Rie Kawakami
Tomomi Kosuzuki
Megumi Mashiko
Naoko Sugahara
Tomoe Soeda
Mika Takabayashi
Ikumi Takudo
Kimi Taneda
Miki Uramoto
Erika Yoshida

Tournament

  

 

  
Quarterfinals

  
Semifinals

  
Bronze medal game

Wheelchair fencing

Wheelchair rugby

Wheelchair tennis

Men

Women

Quads

See also
Japan at the Paralympics
Japan at the 2008 Summer Olympics

References

Nations at the 2008 Summer Paralympics
2008
Paralympics